mysterious love is the 17th single of the Japanese pop singer Miho Komatsu released under Giza studio label. It was released 27 November 2002. The single reached #16 rank first week and sold 9,055 copies. It is charted for 3 weeks and sold totally 11,469 copies. This is last time when single sold more than ten thousand copies and reach top 20 ranks in Oricon.

Track list
All songs are written and composed by Miho Komatsu
mysterious love
arrangement: Akihito Tokunaga (Doa)
the song was used as an ending song for NTV show TV Ojamanbou.

arrangement: Hitoshi Okamoto (Garnet Crow)

arrangement and remix: Hiroshi Asai (The Tambourines)
rearranged version of style of my own from 5th album Miho Komatsu 5 ~source~
mysterious love (instrumental)

References 

2002 singles
Miho Komatsu songs
Songs written by Miho Komatsu
2002 songs
Giza Studio singles
Being Inc. singles
Song recordings produced by Daiko Nagato